Gopipur  is a village in Kapurthala district of Punjab State, India. The village is administrated by a Sarpanch, who is an elected representative.

Demography 
According to the report published by Census India in 2011, Gopipur has total number of 199 houses and population of 1,075 of which include 600 males and 475 females. Literacy rate of Gopipur is 77.65%, higher than state average of 75.84%.  The population of children under the age of 6 years is 86 which is 8.00% of total population of Gopipur, and child sex ratio is approximately  593, lower than state average of 846.

Population data

Air travel connectivity 
The closest airport to the village is Sri Guru Ram Dass Jee International Airport.

Villages in Kapurthala

References

External links
  Villages in Kapurthala
 Kapurthala Villages List

Villages in Kapurthala district